Mianning may refer to:

Mianning County, a county in Liangshan Yi Autonomous Prefecture, Sichuan, China.
Daoguang Emperor (1782–1850), named Mianning, emperor of the Qing Dynasty
Mianning, another name for Lincang, Yunnan, China